Boston Kickout is a 1995 British drama feature film written and directed by Paul Hills. It won the Euskal Media Prize at the San Sebastián International Film Festival, Best Actor (John Simm) at the Cinema Jove International Film Festival in Valencia and Best Film at the Bermuda International Film Festival.

Plot
Schoolleaver Phil (Simm) – who moved with his father from an inner-city slum to what he was told would be a brighter future in Stevenage – finds himself caught up in a world of unemployment, violence, alcoholism and drug abuse in Nineties Britain.

Cast
 John Simm as Phil 
 Andrew Lincoln as Ted 
 Marc Warren as Robert 
 Emer McCourt as Shona 
 Derek Martin
 Richard Hanson as Steven
 Nathan Valente as Matt
 Jamie Beckett as Dopey

Reception
There were not enough critic reviews reported on the website Rotten Tomatoes for the review aggregator to receive a rating."

References

External links
 
 
 
 

British drama films
1990s English-language films